IBM CICS Transaction Gateway provides secure access to CICS from Java, Java EE, .NET Framework, C and C++ applications, using Internet protocols (for example TCP/IP).

CICS Transaction Gateway also includes the same capabilities as IBM CICS Universal Client.

There are three products in the CICS Transaction Gateway family:
 CICS Transaction Gateway for z/OS
 CICS Transaction Gateway for Multiplatforms
 CICS Transaction Gateway Desktop Edition

Further information about CICS Transaction Gateway is available at IBM online.

IBM software